Lindbergh Center station is an at-grade train station in Atlanta, Georgia, serving the Red and Gold lines of the Metropolitan Atlanta Rapid Transit Authority (MARTA) rail system. It serves the Lindbergh/Morosgo neighborhood in southern Buckhead, and is a part-time terminus of the Red Line and the last transfer point for the Red (North Springs) and Gold (Doraville) rail lines. It is the only station on this route served by the Red and Gold lines at all times.  This is the third busiest station in the MARTA system, handling an average of 23,400 boardings per weekday. It is important to the MARTA system for a number of reasons. It is adjacent to the MARTA headquarters building, located just north of the Armour Yard Rail Services Facility (opened in 2005), which allows trains to come into service at a more central location than was previously possible, and at an important junction point for the future Belt Line and Clifton Corridor.

On the first floor of the headquarters building is the MARTA Reduced Fare Office. It provides access to The Lindbergh Center business, shopping, and dining district, MARTA headquarters, the twin AT&T towers (formerly BellSouth), Xpress bus service to Discover Mills and HighTech Institute. It also provides connecting bus service to Ansley Mall, Atlanta History Center, Emory University, Northlake Mall, Toco Hills Shopping Plaza, Georgia Department of Labor, and the Dekalb-Peachtree Airport.

Station layout

History
Originally, the station consisted of a single island platform when opened in 1984. In 2002, during the development of the surrounding area, a side platform was constructed on the northbound side of the station to accommodate the increased ridership and transfers between the Red and Gold rail lines.

Parking
Lindbergh Center has three parking decks for MARTA patrons.  City center has 1,578 parking spaces, Garson has 785 parking spaces, and Sidney Marcus has 544 parking spaces. Due to underuse, some decks may have closed down several levels.

Bus routes
The station is served by the following MARTA bus routes:

North Bus Bays
 Route 5 - Piedmont Road / Sandy Springs
 Route 30 - LaVista Road
 Route 39 - Buford Highway

South Bus Bays
 Route 6 - Clifton Road / Emory University
 Route 809 - Monroe Drive / Boulevard

Connections to other transit systems
Georgia Regional Transportation Authority*
 Georgia Bus Lines Buford Highway jitneys (privately owned; no free transfers to/from MARTA)

References

External links
MARTA station page
nycsubway.org Atlanta page
 Main Street entrance from Google Maps Street View
 Morosgo Drive entrance from Google Maps Street View

Gold Line (MARTA)
Red Line (MARTA)
Metropolitan Atlanta Rapid Transit Authority stations
Railway stations in the United States opened in 1984
Railway stations in Atlanta
1984 establishments in Georgia (U.S. state)